Nokken may refer to:
 Nøkken, a water spirit in Germanic mythology
 Nokken, Copenhagen, a place in Denmark
 Frida Nokken (born 1948), Norwegian civil servant

See also 
 Wilhelm Theodor Nocken, German painter